is a large classical Kuiper belt object and a possible dwarf planet in the Kuiper belt, a region of icy planetesimals beyond Neptune. It was discovered in 2002 by Chad Trujillo and Michael Brown, and has precovery images back to 8 April 1954.

,  is 46.4 AU from the Sun. It will reach perihelion, its closest point to the Sun, in 2123.

History

Discovery 
 was discovered on 18 June 2002 by astronomers Chad Trujillo and Michael Brown at Palomar Observatory in San Diego County, California, United States. The discovery formed part their Caltech Wide Area Sky Survey for bright Kuiper belt objects using the observatory's  Samuel Oschin telescope with its wide-field CCD camera, which was operated jointly with the nightly Near Earth Asteroid Tracking program at Palomar.

 was found through manual vetting of potential moving objects identified by the team's automatic image-searching software. It was among the fainter objects detected, just below the survey's limiting magnitude with an observed brightness of magnitude 20.9. Follow-up observations were conducted two months later with Palomar Observatory's  telescope on 8 August 2002.

Further observations 
Since receiving follow-up in August 2002,  remained unobserved for more than nine months until it was recovered by Trujillo at Palomar Observatory on 29 May 2003, followed by observations by Wolf Bickel at Bergisch Gladbach Observatory in Germany in June 2003. These recovery observations significantly improved 's orbit, allowing for further extrapolation of its position backwards in time for identification in precovery observations. Seven precovery observations from Digitized Sky Survey plates were identified by astronomer Andrew Lowe in 2007; the earliest of these was taken on 8 April 1954 by Palomar Observatory.

,  has a well-determined orbit with an uncertainty parameter of 3. With an observation arc of over 66 years, it has been observed throughout 24% of its orbital period.

Numbering and naming 
 received its permanent minor planet number of 307261 by the Minor Planet Center on 10 December 2011. As of yet, it remains unnamed and the discoverers' privilege for naming this object has expired ten years since its numbering. Per naming guidelines by the International Astronomical Union's Working Group Small Body Nomenclature,  is open for name suggestions that pertain to creation myths, as required for Kuiper belt objects in general.

Visibility 

 is located near the Milky Way's Galactic Center in the southern celestial hemisphere and it has been passing through that region's dense field of background stars since its discovery. Combined with its faint apparent magnitude of 20.5 as seen from Earth,  at its crowded location can make Earth-based observations difficult. On the other hand, 's location also makes it viable for observing stellar occultations as there are numerous stars for it to pass in front of. Several occultation events by  have been observed from Earth since 2019, including one noteworthy event that involved an international campaign of 116 observers on 8 August 2020.

Orbit and classification 

 orbits beyond Neptune with an orbital period of 269 years. Its semi-major axis or average orbital distance from the Sun is 41.7 astronomical units (AU), with a moderate orbital eccentricity of 0.15. In its eccentric orbit,  comes within 35.7 AU from the Sun at perihelion and 47.8 AU at aphelion. It has an orbital inclination of nearly 18° with respect to the ecliptic.  last passed perihelion in April 1853 and will make its next perihelion passage in June 2123.

 is located in the classical region of the Kuiper belt 37–48 AU from the Sun, and is thus classified as a classical Kuiper belt object or cubewano. Its high orbital inclination qualifies it as a dynamically "hot" member of the classical Kuiper belt, which implies it may have been gravitationally scattered out to its present location by Neptune early in its history. 's present orbit is far enough from Neptune (minimum orbit intersection distance 6.6 AU) that it no longer experiences scattering from close encounters with the planet.

 is in an intermittent 18:11 mean-motion orbital resonance with Neptune, as shown in numerical simulations of its orbit over a 10-million-year timespan. This weak resonance primarily affects 's orbital inclination irregularly, but it may alternate to affecting its eccentricity as well.

Physical characteristics

Size 

Seven occultation events were observed from 2019 to 2021. The most successful was on 8 August 2020, involving 116 telescopes.

 has measured color indices of B−V= and V−R=, which indicates that it has a neutral (gray) surface color. In Barucci et al.'s classification scheme for TNO color indices,  falls under the BB group of TNOs with neutral colors. No reflectance spectrum of  has been measured as of yet, thus its surface composition remains unknown. Nevertheless, it can be inferred that  lacks volatiles such as nitrogen and methane due to its low geometric albedo of 0.1 determined from New Horizons observations. This low albedo indicates that  has a very dark and unevolved surface depleted in volatiles.

Occultations 

The two positive chords from the event suggested that  may have an oblate shape, with projected dimensions of  km.

On 8 August 2020, a campaign organized by Lucky Star project successfully observed the occultation of a magnitude 14.6 star with 61 positive detections. Topographic features  in depth and height were observed on 's surface.

Rotation 
Observations made in June and July 2011 took advantage of  moving in front of a dark nebula.

No known moons; possible dwarf status 
 does not have any known moons orbiting it; thus an accurate mass estimate cannot be made. Based on its size alone, Brown lists it as nearly certain to be a dwarf planet. However, its low albedo may imply the opposite: dark, mid-sized bodies such as this, less than about 900–1,000 km in diameter and with albedos less than about 0.2 that suggest they have never been resurfaced, have likely never collapsed into solid bodies, much less differentiated or relaxed into hydrostatic equilibrium, and thus are unlikely to be dwarf planets.

Exploration

New Horizons 

From July 2016 to September 2019,  was observed by the New Horizons spacecraft, as part of its extended Kuiper belt mission. The observations significantly improved the knowledge of 's orbit and phase curve behavior from the scattering properties of its surface.

See also 
 List of Solar System objects by size

Notes

References

External links 
 2002 MS4 Precovery Images
 (307261) 2002 MS4
 

307261
Discoveries by Michael E. Brown
Discoveries by Chad Trujillo
307261
Objects observed by stellar occultation
20020618